Le cose che vivi (English: "The Things You Live") is the fourth studio album by Italian singer Laura Pausini, released by CGD East West (Warner) Records in 1996. Las cosas que vives is its second Spanish-language edition for the hispanophone market. It has sold over 300,000 copies in Spain and its worldwide sales exceed 3 million copies.

In March 1997, the World Wide Tour 1997 began, supporting the album's Italian version. It ended in June 1997.

Track listing

Le cose che vivi

Las cosas que vives

Charts

Weekly charts

Year-end charts

Certifications and sales

References 

Other sources
 "Song Search". Warner Chappell Music (Italy). Accessed 24 August 2007.
 "ACE Title Search". ASCAP. Accessed 24 August 2007.

1996 albums
Laura Pausini albums
Italian-language albums
Spanish-language albums
Compagnia Generale del Disco albums